is a city located in Fukui Prefecture, Japan. ,  the city had an estimated population of 69,338 in 24,167 households and the population density of 820 persons per km2.

Geography
Sabae is located in central Fukui Prefecture, bordered by the city Fukui to the north and Echizen to the south.

Neighbouring municipalities
Fukui Prefecture
Fukui
Echizen
Ikeda
Echizen (town)

Climate
Sabae has a Humid climate (Köppen Cfa) characterized by warm, wet summers and cold winters with heavy snowfall.  The average annual temperature in Sabae is 14.3 °C. The average annual rainfall is 2417 mm with September as the wettest month. The temperatures are highest on average in August, at around 26.8 °C, and lowest in January, at around 3.0 °C.

Demographics
Per Japanese census data, the population of Sabae has grown steadily over the past 50 years.

History
Sabae is part of ancient Echizen Province. During the Edo period, the area was part of the holdings of Sabae Domain. Following the Meiji restoration, it was organised into part of Imadate District in Fukui Prefecture. With the establishment of the modern municipalities system on April 1, 1889, the town of Sabae was established. It merged with the villages of Shinyokoe and Funatsu in 1948, and with the villages of Shinmei, Katakami, Nakagawa, and the villages of Tachimachi, Yoshikawa and Yutaka from Nyū District to form the city of Sabae on January 15, 1955. The city annexed the village of Kawada in March 1957. In 1995, the city was host to the World Gymnastics Championships

Government
Sabae has a mayor-council form of government with a directly elected mayor and a unicameral city legislature of 20 members.

Economy
Sabae is one of the largest manufacturing centers of eyeglass frames in Japan. Sabae is also home to a significant chemical and rayon industry.

Education
Sabae has 12 public elementary schools and three middle schools operated by the city government, and two public high schools operated by the Fukui Prefectural Board of Education. The National Institute of Technology, Fukui College (NIT-Fukui), operated by the national government, is also located in Sabae.

Transportation

Railway
  JR West - Hokuriku Main Line
 , 
  Fukui Railway Fukubu Line
  -  -  -  -  -

Highway
 Hokuriku Expressway

Local attractions
 Nishiyama Park (West Mountain Park) is particularly beautiful in springtime, when hundreds of azaleas trees bloom on the slopes.
 Nishiyama Zoo is inside the park.
 ruins of Mitsumine Castle are located within the city.
 Ōzan Kofun Cluster, A National Historic Site
 Kabutoyama Kofun, A National Historic Site
 Sabae Megane Museum

References

External links
  

 
Cities in Fukui Prefecture